Joko Sidik (born May 20, 1988 in Samarinda) is an Indonesian footballer who currently plays for Mitra Kukar in the Liga 1.

References

External links

1988 births
Association football defenders
Living people
Indonesian footballers
Liga 1 (Indonesia) players
Persisam Putra Samarinda players
Bontang F.C. players
People from Samarinda
Sportspeople from East Kalimantan